Mohammadiyeh is a city in Alborz Province, Iran.

Mohammadiyeh may also refer to:
 Mohammadiyeh-e Olya, Hamadan Province
 Mohammadiyeh-e Sofla, Hamadan Province
 Mohammadiyeh, Falavarjan, Isfahan Province
 Mohammadiyeh, Shahreza, Isfahan Province
 Mohammadiyeh, Tiran and Karvan, Isfahan Province
 Mohammadiyeh, Arak, Markazi Province
 Mohammadiyeh, Khomeyn, Markazi Province
 Mohammadiyeh, Rafsanjan, Kerman Province
 Mohammadiyeh, Sirjan, Kerman Province
 Mohammadiyeh, Kashmar, Razavi Khorasan Province
 Mohammadiyeh, Mashhad, Razavi Khorasan Province
 Mohammadiyeh, Darmian, South Khorasan Province
 Mohammadiyeh, Khusf, South Khorasan Province
 Mohammadiyeh, Tabas, South Khorasan Province
 Mohammadiyeh, Yazd
 Mohammadiyeh District, in Alborz Province
 Mohammadiyeh Rural District, in Yazd Province